Amerindios is the first album by the folk music group Amerindios.

Track listing 
All songs written by Amerindios; co-writers as noted.
Side A
 Nixon (Sergio Ortega)
 Una vez un yankee yo encontré (Ortega)
 Los Vietnamitas (Carlos Puebla)
 Sr. Juez
 ¡Achís! ¡Achís! Qué catarro
 La disparada (Geraldo Vandré)

Side B
 Juan Verdejo (Rene Figueroa)
 Mentiras sólo mentiras
 Sembrador de lunas (Bernardo Dewers)
 Como un árbol
 Mes de volantines
 Blanco, rojo y azul

External links 
 Música Popular: Amerindios: Amerindios

Amerindios albums
1970 debut albums
Spanish-language albums